Maine Township is a township in Linn County, Iowa.

History
Maine Township was organized in 1848.

References

Townships in Linn County, Iowa
Townships in Iowa
1848 establishments in Iowa
Populated places established in 1848